Jacques Ben Gualid (born 3 May 1918) is a Moroccan foil and sabre fencer. He competed in three events at the 1960 Summer Olympics.

References

External links
 

1918 births
Possibly living people
Moroccan male foil fencers
Olympic fencers of Morocco
Fencers at the 1960 Summer Olympics
Sportspeople from Casablanca
Moroccan male sabre fencers
20th-century Moroccan people